Diocese of Central Europe may refer to:

 Antiochian Orthodox Diocese of Germany and Central Europe, a diocese (eparchy) of the Greek Orthodox Patriarchate of Antioch
 Bulgarian Orthodox Diocese of Western and Central Europe, a diocese (eparchy) of the Bulgarian Orthodox Church
 Romanian Orthodox Diocese of Germany and Central Europe, a diocese (eparchy) of the Romanian Orthodox Church
 Serbian Orthodox Diocese of Central Europe, former name of the Serbian Orthodox Eparchy of Frankfurt and all of Germany

See also
 Diocese in Europe
 Diocese of Western Europe (disambiguation)